The Japanese occupation of Attu was the result of an invasion of the Aleutian Islands in Alaska during World War II. Imperial Japanese Army troops landed on 7 June 1942 the day after the invasion of Kiska. The invasions on Attu Island and Kiska were conducted under the AL operation in the Japanese military. (For background and purpose, see Japanese occupation of Kiska.) Along with the Kiska landing, it was the first time that the continental United States was invaded and occupied by a foreign power since the War of 1812, and was the second of the only two invasions of the United States during World War II. The occupation ended with the Allied victory in the Battle of Attu on 30 May 1943.

Occupation
In May 1942, the Japanese began near-simultaneous campaigns against Midway, and the Aleutians, thus beginning the Aleutian Islands Campaign. During the Battle of Midway, Japanese forces were repulsed in a decisive action, meanwhile, on 7 June, Japanese naval forces under Boshirō Hosogaya landed troops unopposed at Attu in conjunction with the same forces invading Kiska the previous day. A force consisting of 1,140 infantry under Major Matsutoshi Hosumi took control of the island and captured Attu's population, which consisted of 45 Aleuts and two white Americans, Charles Foster Jones (1879-1942), an amateur radio operator and weather reporter, originally from St. Paris, Ohio, and his wife Etta (1879-1965), a teacher and nurse, originally from Vineland, New Jersey. The village consisted of several houses around Chichagof Harbor on the northeast side of the island.

The 42 Aleut inhabitants who survived the Japanese invasion were taken to a prison camp near Otaru, Hokkaido. Sixteen of them died while they were imprisoned. Charles Jones was killed by the Japanese forces immediately after the invasion due to his refusal to fix the radio he previously destroyed to prevent the occupying troops from using it. His wife was subsequently taken to the Bund Hotel in Yokohama, Japan, which housed Australian Rabaul New Britain nurses who had been taken prisoner during the capture of Rabaul in 1942. They were later transferred to the Yokohama Yacht Club and kept there from 1942 to July 1944 when then moved to the old Totsuka Hospital, also in Yokohama. The hospital served as a civilian prisoner of war camp until the end of the war in August 1945. Etta Jones died in December 1965 at age 86 in Bradenton, Florida. 

After landing, the soldiers began constructing an airbase and fortifications. The nearest American forces were on Unalaska Island at Dutch Harbor and at an airbase on Adak Island. Throughout the occupation, American air and naval forces bombarded the island. Initially the Japanese intended to hold the Aleutians only until the winter of 1942; however, the occupation continued into 1943 in order to deny the Americans use of the islands. In August 1942, the garrison of Attu was moved to Kiska to help repel a suspected American attack. From August to October 1942, Attu was unoccupied until a 2,900-man force under Colonel Yasuyo Yamasaki arrived. The new garrison of Attu continued constructing the airfield and fortifications until 11 May 1943, when a 15,000 man army of American troops landed.

Allied forces under General John L. DeWitt took control of the island on 30 May after the remaining Japanese troops conducted a massive banzai charge. American forces lost 549 killed and 1,148 wounded, another 2,100 evacuated due to weather-related injuries. During the Battle of Attu, all but 29 men of the Japanese garrison were killed. The occupation ended with an American victory and American forces deemed the half-completed airfield as not ideally situated. After building a new airfield the Americans launched bomber attacks against the Japanese home islands for the remainder of the war 

Attu village was abandoned after the war, and surviving members of Japanese internment were moved to other islands after the war. In 2012, for the 70th anniversary of the occupation, a memorial to Attu village was dedicated at the former site of the town.

See also
 Attacks on North America during World War II

References

 
 
 
 
 Mason, Rachel. "Attu, A Lost Village of the Aleutians." Alaska Park Science, Volume 10, Issue 2

1942 in Alaska
1943 in Alaska
Aleutian Islands campaign
American Theater of World War II
Attu
World War II occupied territories
Amphibious operations of World War II
Attu Island